Palaeocarcharodon, also known as the pygmy white shark, is a genus of shark within the family Otodontidae that lived about 61.7 to 55.8 Ma during the Paleocene. It currently contains a sole species P. orientalis.

Description
Teeth of Palaeocarcharodon are triangular, labio-lingually compressed, with quite irregular serrations and serrate lateral cusplets.

References

Otodontidae
Prehistoric fish of Africa
Prehistoric fish of Asia
Prehistoric fish of North America
Fossils of the United States
Paleocene sharks